The following is a list of all suspensions and fines enforced in the National Hockey League (NHL) during the 2015–16 NHL season. It lists which players or coaches of what team have been punished for which offense and the amount of punishment they have received.

Based on each player's average annual salary, divided by number of days in the season (186) for first time offenders and games (82) for repeat offenders, salary will be forfeited for the term of their suspension. Players' money forfeited due to suspension or fine goes to the Players' Emergency Assistance Fund, while money forfeited by coaches, staff or organizations as a whole go to the NHL Foundation.

Suspensions
‡ - suspension covered at least one 2016 post-season game

# - Suspension was later reduced upon further review/successful appeal; information presented in italics

 - Player was considered a repeat offender under the terms of the Collective Bargaining Agreement (player had been suspended in the 18 months prior to this suspension)

 All figures are in US dollars.
 Suspension accompanied by mandatory referral to the NHL/NHLPA Program for Substance Abuse and Behavioral Health - Stage 2. Suspension completed only upon being cleared for on-ice competition by the program administrators. Kassian was reinstated by the NHL on December 15, 2015 after missing 31 games.
 Suspension accompanied by mandatory referral to the NHL/NHLPA Program for Substance Abuse and Behavioral Health.
 Wideman's original suspension was for 20 games. Suspension was appealed by Wideman and the NHLPA on February 3, 2016. On February 17, 2016, NHL Commissioner Gary Bettman announced he had heard the appeal and was upholding the original 20 game suspension levied to Wideman. The NHLPA then appealed to neutral arbitrator. On March 11, 2016, NHL/NHLPA Neutral Discipline Arbitrator, James Oldham, overruled the NHL and Bettman's 20 game suspension down to 10 games. Though Wideman had already missed 19 of his originally assessed 20 games before Oldham's decision was made, his suspension will stand as 10 games in the NHL records and his salary was refunded for the 9 games he missed.
 Suspension accompanied by mandatory referral to the NHL/NHLPA Program for Substance Abuse and Behavioral Health. Only sixteen games remained in the Arizona Coyotes season at the time of the suspension, so the remaining four games were served at the start of the 2016–17 NHL season; as he was mid-suspension, Tinordi was also barred from playing in any 2016 preseason games.
 Suspension accompanied by mandatory referral to sensitivity training, as a well as an additional fine (see below) as there is no salary to be forfeited in a playoff game.
 As the Philadelphia Flyers were eliminated from the playoffs, Schenn's suspension was instead made to be served in his first three games of the 2016–17 NHL regular season.

Fines
Players can be fined up to 50% of one day's salary, up to a maximum of $10,000.00 for their first offense, and $15,000.00 for any subsequent offenses. Fines listed in italics indicate that was the maximum allowed fine.

Coaches, non-playing personnel, and teams are not restricted to such maximums.

Fines for players/coaches fined for diving/embellishment are structured uniquely and are only handed out after non-publicized warnings are given to the player/coach for their first offense. For more details on diving/embellishment fines:

 For coach incident totals, each citation issued to a player on his club counts toward his total.
 All figures are in US dollars.

 All figures are in US dollars.
 Fine accompanied by mandatory referral to sensitivity training, as a well as an additional suspension (see above) as there is no salary to be forfeited in a playoff game.

Further reading

See also 
 2014–15 NHL suspensions and fines
 2016–17 NHL suspensions and fines
 2015 in sports
 2016 in sports
 2015 NHL Entry Draft
 2015–16 NHL season
 2015–16 NHL transactions
 2015–16 NHL Three Star Awards

References

Suspension And Fines
National Hockey League suspensions and fines